Bob Ramsey may refer to:

 Bob Ramsay (footballer) (1864–?), English professional footballer
 Bob Ramsey (footballer, born 1935) (born 1935), English professional footballer
 Bob Ramsey (soccer) (born 1957), retired American soccer player
 Bob Ramsey (politician) (born 1947), member of the Tennessee House of Representatives

See also 
 Robert Ramsey (disambiguation)